The National Science Complex (NSC), located on a 21.9–hectare lot in the University of the Philippines Diliman, is envisioned to serve as the Philippines' national hub for the generation and application of new scientific knowledge in the natural and applied sciences and mathematics.

The National Science Complex was created by President Gloria Macapagal Arroyo through an executive order (EO 583).  The University of the Philippines College of Science operates the NSC.

Images

References

External links

 Website

University of the Philippines Diliman
Science parks in Metro Manila
Buildings and structures in Quezon City